Fusicolla is a genus of seven species of ascomycete fungi in the family Nectriaceae. The genus was circumscribed by German mycologist Hermann Friedrich Bonorden in 1851. Fungi in the genus produce slimy orange sheets over the substrate, within which the perithecia can be either fully or partially immersed. Asexual spores are similar to those of Fusarium.

Species
Fusicolla acetilerea
Fusicolla aquaeductuum
Fusicolla betae
Fusicolla epistroma
Fusicolla matuoi
Fusicolla merismoides
Fusicolla violacea

References

External links
 

Nectriaceae genera